Corporal Benito Martinez (April 21, 1932 – September 6, 1952) was a United States Army soldier who posthumously received the Medal of Honor — the United States' highest military decoration — for his actions on the near Satae-ri in  Korea during the Korean War. Martinez was mortally wounded while solely defending his outpost. His actions enabled his company to take back the terrain which they had lost.

Early years
Martinez was a Mexican-American born to Mr. and Mrs. Francisco Martinez in Fort Hancock, Texas.  There, he received his primary and secondary education.  He joined the United States Army in 1950 at the recruiting station in his hometown. Martinez completed his basic training and was eventually assigned to Company A (Able Company) of the 27th Infantry Regiment.

Korean War
North Korea invaded the Republic of Korea on June 25, 1950. The 27th Infantry Regiment, part of the 25th Infantry Division, was stationed in Hawaii, and in July was put on alert. By July 18, the entire division was in Pusan in Republic of Korea.

On February 23, 1952, the 25th Division, under the command of Major General Ira P. Swift, was in the front line in the center of the X Corps sector near Mundung-ni northeast of the Hwach'on Reservoir. The division assumed the front line routine of patrols, ambushes, artillery exchanges, and bunker maintenance. The division also secured and defended forward outposts beyond the Jamestown Line, the main line of resistance.

Martinez's unit, the 2nd Platoon of A Company, inherited a  position known as Sandbag Castle from Charlie Company. On the night of September 5, 1952, Corporal Martinez was in Outpost Agnes performing forward listening-post duties. Outpost Agnes was a bunker large enough to hold four soldiers. Shortly after midnight, the Korean People's Army (KPA) began shelling Sandbag Castle. During a lull in the shelling, the men of the 27th inside the castle were able to spot crawling KPA soldiers, whose intentions were to cut off the forward bunkers and Outpost Agnes.

Martinez ordered the three men in his bunker to return to the Sandbag Castle. His commanding officer, Lieutenant McLean, called him on the sound power telephone and ordered him to get out. Martinez, knowing the situation better than anyone, replied that he would have to stay on and delay the KPA as long as possible. Martinez, along with Private First Class Paul G. Myatt, remained at his post and with his machine gun inflicted numerous casualties on the attacking troops. When he ran out of ammunition, he retreated to a bunker destroyed by enemy shelling and from there continued his assault with a Browning automatic rifle. Martinez was mortally wounded and Myatt was taken prisoner before their unit was able to counterattack and regain their terrain.
 
On December 29, 1953, President Harry S. Truman presented the family of Benito Martinez with the Medal of Honor.

Medal of Honor citation

Honors
Cpl. Benito Martinez was buried in Fort Hancock Cemetery and exhumed in the 1980s to be buried with full military honors at Fort Bliss National Cemetery in El Paso, Texas.  Both cities, El Paso and Fort Hancock, have honored his memory by naming elementary schools after him.

Awards and recognitions
Among Benito Martinez's decorations and medals were:

See also

List of Medal of Honor recipients
List of Korean War Medal of Honor recipients
Hispanic Medal of Honor recipients

References

Further reading

1932 births
1952 deaths
United States Army soldiers
United States Army personnel of the Korean War
Korean War recipients of the Medal of Honor
United States Army Medal of Honor recipients
American people of Mexican descent
People from Hudspeth County, Texas
American military personnel killed in the Korean War